J. C. Diwakar Reddy is a politician from  Andhra Pradesh. He won the Anantapur seat in the 2014 Indian general election as a Telugu Desam Party candidate. J. C. Diwakar Reddy was born to J. C. Nagi Reddy in Juturu village, Peddapappur Mandal, Anantapur District (a well known politician and freedom fighter in Anantapur district).

Political career
Reddy has been elected 6 times to the State Assembly from the Tadipatri constituency in the Anantapur district. He was denied entry into the cabinet in 2009 and also later in N. Kiran Kumar Reddy’s ministry in 2010. He served as Pro tem Speaker in 2011 .

Personal life
JC Reddy graduated with a Bachelor of Science degree. He has a son JC Pavan Reddy and a daughter.

References

http://m.ndtv.com/india-news/no-need-to-say-sorry-says-tdp-lawmaker-banned-by-4-airlines-after-ruckus-1712917?pfrom=home-topstories

Living people
1945 births
India MPs 2019–present
Telugu Desam Party politicians
Lok Sabha members from Andhra Pradesh
People from Anantapur, Andhra Pradesh
Telugu politicians
Businesspeople from Andhra Pradesh
Indian National Congress politicians from Andhra Pradesh